Stosz is a surname. Notable people with the surname include:

Patryk Stosz (born 1994), Polish professional racing cyclist
Sandra L. Stosz (born 1960), retired United States Coast Guard Vice Admiral